Sheetal Sheth (born June 24, 1976 ) is an American actress, author, producer, and activist.

She starred opposite Albert Brooks in his film Looking for Comedy in the Muslim World. She debuted to rave reviews in the films ABCD and American Chai, and has appeared in the films I Can't Think Straight and The World Unseen. Sheth has won multiple best actress awards on the festival circuit and has been selected to represent brands such as CHI haircare and Reebok.

She is also the first Indian American to appear in Maxim magazine. Sheetal's had op-eds published on CNN, The Daily Beast, and Thrive Global. Her first children's book, Always Anjali, debuted to critical acclaim and became is set to be a series. This series is the first picture book series that features a South Asian hero.

Early life and education
Sheth was born in Trenton, New Jersey, and is a first-generation Gujarati Indian American. Her parents came to the United States from Gujarat, India in 1972.

As a child, Sheth loved performing and watching television and films, but academics were her priority. She also studied multicultural dance and was very involved in athletics, particularly basketball. Although her parents were devout Jains and active in the local Jain community, they enrolled Sheth in the local Catholic school because of its focus on academics and reputation for toughness. Sheth attended Catholic school until age 12, when her family moved to Trenton.

Sheth attended Liberty High School in Bethlehem, Pennsylvania, where she was very involved in school organizations and student government, serving on the student advisory board. She received the student government award for her contribution to the school, and was one of two students invited to speak at her commencement. While in high school, Sheth discovered her passion for acting and was determined to master the craft through study and performance. After considering a variety of undergraduate programs, Sheth auditioned and was accepted to the New York University Tisch School of the Arts.

At Tisch, Sheth studied the classics, and some of her favorite works included Antigone and The Crucible. She also trained extensively at the Lee Strasberg Theatre and Film Institute in the technique known as "The Method". She spent a summer abroad in Amsterdam as part of the intensive International Theatre Workshop, studying under such respected acting teachers as Kristin Linklater. Sheth excelled and earned the honor of being selected to participate in the Tisch Scholar's Program. After graduating from Tisch with honors Sheth continued her studies even as she built a successful career. In New York she studied with Wynn Handman, one of the founders of The American Place Theatre. In Los Angeles, she attended weekly invitation-only classes with renowned acting instructor Milton Katselas until his death in 2008.

Career

1999–2005 
Sheth debuted as the lead in the ground-breaking 1999 film ABCD, starring opposite Aasif Mandvi and Faran Tahir. The film won Best Indie Feature at the Houston film festival and received critical acclaim from the likes of The Hollywood Reporter and Rolling Stone Sheth was widely praised for her performance. Both the film and Sheth's character stirred considerable controversy. "But," Sheth responded, "that is exactly the kind of character I like to play. I want to tell the kinds of stories that people have a strong reaction to, positive or negative. It means it has touched them in some way and then I have done my job."

In 2001, she played a dancer in American Chai. The film won the Audience Award at the 2001 Slamdance Film Festival, with the New York Post describing it as a "slight but sweet film". Sheth went on to perform in a variety of roles in independent film and on network television, including the lead in the film Wings of Hope, for which she won Best Actress at Cinevue Film Festival.

2005–2010 

In 2005, Sheth starred as Maya opposite Albert Brooks in Brooks' film Looking for Comedy in the Muslim World. Brooks conducted an extensive international search for the ideal actor to portray Maya, and says of Sheth, "Once I came across her, I watched everything that I could. I didn't care to look at anybody else…I just knew I had to put her in the film." The film was shot on location in India (Delhi and Agra). Sony Pictures Entertainment originally carried the film, but Brooks parted ways with them when he refused Sony's demand to remove the word "Muslim" from the title. The film was picked up and ultimately released by Warner Independent Pictures.

Following her success in Looking for Comedy in the Muslim World, Sheth won the recurring role of Martina in the NBC TV series The Singles Table, starring opposite Alicia Silverstone and John Cho. Six episodes were shot, but the series never aired. She also performed in the ensemble The Trouble With Romance and starred in the thriller First Fear opposite Sean Patrick Flanery.

Sheth's work brought her to the attention of the award-winning writer and director Shamim Sarif. Sheth starred opposite Lisa Ray in two lesbian themed films, I Can't Think Straight and The World Unseen, both written and directed by Sarif. I Can't Think Straight won more than ten Best Feature awards at film festivals around the world. The World Unseen premiered at the Toronto International Film Festival and went on to win four Best Feature awards internationally. The World Unseen, which was shot on location in South Africa, also swept the 2008 South African Film and Television Awards, winning eleven SAFTA's (South Africa's equivalent to the Oscars). Sheth won three Best Actress awards for her performance in The World Unseen. Both movies have achieved cult status, and have earned Sheth a large, loyal fan base for her portrayals of Leyla (I Can't Think Straight) and Amina (The World Unseen).

2010–present 
Sheth went on to perform in Why Am I Doing This, and starred in Stalemate opposite Josh Randall and Burgess Jenkins, for which she was nominated for Best Actress at the 2011 Staten Island Film Festival. She guest starred in the popular television shows Nip/Tuck, Royal Pains and NCIS: Los Angeles, and provided the voices for Sumi and Shark in the animated feature film Johnny Bravo Goes to Bollywood, based on Cartoon Network's popular animated television series Johnny Bravo.

In 2011, Sheth starred opposite Mercedes Masöhn and Angela Zahra in Three Veils, which portrays three Middle Eastern women living in the United States. Even before it was released the film sparked intense controversy, and death threats were made against those involved with the production of the film. Three Veils has won numerous Best Feature awards at film festivals internationally, and Sheth's performance was widely acclaimed.

In 2012, Sheth continued to choose a variety of challenging roles in independent films. She starred opposite Lynn Chen and Parry Shen in Yes, We're Open, a sex comedy exploring open relationships. She again paired with Chen in Nice Girls Crew, which also stars Michelle Krusiec, and starred in The Wisdom Tree, a film blending science fiction, new age and mysticism. Sheth stepped behind the camera to co-produce Reign, a short film dramatizing how miscommunication can lead to war. She also starred in the film, which was written and directed by Kimberly Jentzen and shot by Oscar-nominated Cinematographer Jack Green. Reign received the Award of Merit from Best Shorts.

Sheth began her career at a time when few South Asians and very few Indian American women were making their living as actors. Still, she was surprised to find herself a pioneer. Nothing in her experience, education or personal outlook had prepared her for the role her ethnicity would play in casting decisions. She was frequently expected to change her name to something "more American," and was even denied representation when she chose to perform under her own name. Ultimately her body of work demonstrates that her expertise as an actor and her talent for accents enables her to portray characters of a wide variety of ethnicities, temperaments and circumstances. Her successful career has opened doors for other South Asian actors to pursue careers in American film and television. Sheth supports Asian Americans and other under-represented groups in their pursuit of careers in the entertainment industry, not only through her own pioneering work as an actor, but also by appearing at festivals, workshops and panels and speaking directly to issues facing those communities.

Other projects 
Sheth was selected as the spokesperson for CHI haircare products and represented Reebok's New York sneaker in their 2008 international Freestyle campaign. She was also the first Indian American to appear in Maxim magazine. CHI says of Sheth, "Grace, artistry, passion and the most compelling elements of every culture – that's the essence of Sheth."

Humanitarian causes 
While at New York University, Sheth was selected to be a part of AmeriCorps, a division of the Corporation for National and Community Service created by U.S. President Bill Clinton. Through Americorps, she worked at an inner-city high school, developing progressive lesson plans and activities, tutoring, and dealing with conflict resolution.

She participates in Big Brothers Big Sisters of Greater Los Angeles as a Big Sister, she also supports and promotes Women's Voices Now an organization which encourage communities that are under-represented in American media to make their voices heard.

Personal life 
Sheth takes an active interest in politics, has served in AmeriCorps, and participates in Big Brothers Big Sisters of Greater Los Angeles as a Big Sister, and she supports and promotes organizations such as Women's Voices Now, which encourage communities that are under-represented in American media to make their voices heard. She also regularly speaks on panels and forums internationally.

Sheth married Neil Mody in 2013. In June 2019, Sheth revealed that she was diagnosed with breast cancer.

Awards 
 Winner, Best Actress, Wings Of Hope, Cinevue Film Festival, 2003
 Winner, Best Actress, The World Unseen, Gran Canaria Film Festival, Spain, 2009
 Winner, Best Actress, The World Unseen, Festival del Mar, Ibiza 2009
 Winner, Best Leading Performance, The World Unseen, Out Takes Film Festival, Dallas 2009

Filmography

Citations

References 

 
 
 
 
 
 
 
 
 
 
 
 
 
 
 
 
 
 
 
 
 
 
 
  Alt URL
 
 
  Alt URL

 
  Alt URL

External links 

 Official Website
 

Actresses from New Jersey
Actresses from Pennsylvania
American film actresses
American people of Gujarati descent
American actresses of Indian descent
American television actresses
American Jains
American voice actresses
Liberty High School (Bethlehem, Pennsylvania) alumni
Living people
People from Bethlehem, Pennsylvania
People from Northampton County, Pennsylvania
People from Phillipsburg, New Jersey
Tisch School of the Arts alumni
21st-century American actresses
1976 births